This is a list of players recruited into teams in the National Hockey League in its first season, the 1917–18 NHL season. Some had been free agents and others were moved as part of two dispersal drafts.

Free agency

Dispersal draft

From Quebec Bulldogs (team pulled out of NHL) November 26, 1917 
Eight players were picked in this dispersal draft.
Joe Hall - Montreal Canadiens
Joe Malone - Montreal Canadiens
Walter Mummery - Montreal Canadiens
Jack Marks - Montreal Wanderers
Dave Ritchie - Montreal Wanderers
Jack McDonald - Montreal Wanderers
Rusty Crawford - Ottawa Senators
Harry Mummery - Toronto Hockey Club

From Montreal Wanderers (disbanded) January 4, 1918 
Five players were picked in this dispersal draft.
Billy Bell - Montreal Canadiens
Jack McDonald -Montreal Canadiens
Dave Ritchie - Ottawa Senators
Harry Hyland - Ottawa Senators
Jack Marks - Toronto Hockey Club

References 
http://www.hockeydb.com
http://www.hockey-reference.com
Toronto Hockey Club
Montreal Canadiens

trans
National Hockey League transactions